Pedro de Betanzos (died 1570) was a Spanish Franciscan missionary and linguist.

Life

Betanzos was born in Betanzos in Galicia. He was one of the earliest Franciscan missionaries to Guatemala, and founder of the Church in Nicaragua. He is said to have acquired, in eight years, the use of fourteen Indian languages, including Nahuatl. In one year, he became fluent in Quiché, Kaqchikel, and Zutuhil.

It was during this time, and on account of his writings, that the controversy began between the Franciscans and Dominicans over the use of the Indian term "Cabovil" as a synonym for God. Betanzos insisted that they were not synonymous and always wrote "Dios", even in Indian idioms. The Dominicans on the other hand kept up the native term "Cabovil". The Franciscans were correct, in that the indigenous peoples had no conception of monotheism, and "Cabovil" does not means a personal supreme Deity.  Betanzos died at Chomez, Nicaragua.

Works

Betanzos was one of the authors of a work published at Mexico and entitled, Arte, Vocabulario y Doctrina Christiana en Lengua de Guatemala. It is probably the book printed in Mexico previous to 1553 and ascribed to the "Franciscan Fathers", and also to Bishop Marroquin of Guatemala. No copy of it, however, is known to exist. It is the earliest work printed in any of the languages of Guatemala.

See also

Spanish conquest of Guatemala
Roman Catholicism in Guatemala

References

Casual mention of Fray Pedro de Betanzos is found in Ycazbalceta, Bibliografia mexicana, (Mexico, 1886), in which an edition of the Catecismo y Doctrina is mentioned (Mexico, 1556), and a reimpression (Guatemala, 1724). The title of the 1556 edition is Catecismo y Doctrina Cristiana en idioma Utlateco ; of the 1724 print, Doctrina Cristiana en lengua Guatemalteca, and while the former is attributed to Bishop Marroquin, the latter has for its authors Fray Juan de Torres and Fray Pedro de Betanzos.

The biographic data are found in Beristain, Bibliot. hispano-americana set. (Mexico, 1816), I, who in turn obtained them from Vazques, Cronica de la Provincia del Illmo, Nombre de Jesus, del Orden de San Francisco de Guatemala (Guatemala, 1714–16). Squier, Monograph of Authors, etc., (New York, 1861), copies Beristain. See also Ludewig, Literature of American Aboriginal Languages (London, 1858).

On the controversy over the use of the words "Dios" and "Cabovil" see Remesal, Historia de la provincia de San Vicente de Chyapa y Guatemala (Madrid, 1619).

References

Attribution

1570 deaths
Spanish Franciscans
Spanish Roman Catholic missionaries
Linguists from Spain
Year of birth unknown
Linguists of Mesoamerican languages
Roman Catholic missionaries in Nicaragua
Roman Catholic missionaries in New Spain
Missionary linguists